Breede River Local Municipality may refer to either of two neighbouring municipalities in the Western Cape province of South Africa:
 Breede Valley Local Municipality, with its seat at Worcester
 Langeberg Local Municipality, formerly the Breede River/Winelands Local Municipality, with its seat at Ashton